J. Anthony Crane, aka Tony Crane, (born October 19, 1972) is an American film, television, and stage actor.

Career

He is known for his portrayal of Remy McSwain in the television series The Big Easy, an adaptation of the 1987 movie. He made his Broadway debut in Sight Unseen by Pulitzer Prize–winning playwright Donald Margulies, understudying Ben Shenkman. He appeared in this role in 2008 at the Old Globe Theatre in San Diego. He appeared as Lancelot in a production of the musical Spamalot in Las Vegas. In 2010, he took on the role of Scar in Disney's musical production of The Lion King.

References

External links
 
 
 

1972 births
Living people
American male film actors
American male stage actors
American male television actors
Male actors from Los Angeles